Miami Metro may refer to:
Miami metropolitan area
Metrorail (Miami), the heavy rail transit system serving the immediate Miami area

See also
Metropolitan Miami (disambiguation)